Deivis Barone Farías (born 28 August 1979 in Canelones) is a Uruguayan footballer who currently plays for Canadian Keguay.

Career
Barone began his professional playing career with River Plate Montevideo, after 5 years with the club he moved to Argentina where he played with Instituto de Córdoba.

Barone then played in Colombia with Junior Barranquilla and Paraguay with Libertad before returning to Uruguay to play for Nacional Montevideo.

In 2008 Barone returned to Argentina when he joined Colón but soon left to play in Venezuela where he played for Unión Atlético Maracaibo and then Caracas FC. In 2009 Barone returned to Argentina again when he signed for newly promoted Atlético Tucumán.

On 11 June 2020, 40-year old Barone announced his retirement. However, he returned to the pitch one month later, signing with Rivera Hinterland. In September 2020, Barone posted pictures playing for Canadian Keguay.

Personal life
Barone's daughter, Fátima Barone, is a member of the Uruguay women's national football team and has represented the country at the 2018 South American U-20 Women's Championship.

References

External links
 Player profile at Tenfield 
 Sports Ya profile 
 Argentine Primera statistics at Fútbol XXI  
 Deivis Barone at Soccerway

1979 births
Living people
Uruguayan footballers
Uruguayan expatriate footballers
Association football defenders
Uruguayan Primera División players
Argentine Primera División players
Primera Nacional players
Paraguayan Primera División players
Categoría Primera A players
Venezuelan Primera División players
Club Atlético River Plate (Montevideo) players
Club Atlético Colón footballers
Instituto footballers
Caracas FC players
Atlético Tucumán footballers
Club Nacional de Football players
Atlético Junior footballers
Club Libertad footballers
San Martín de San Juan footballers
Guillermo Brown footballers
C.A. Rentistas players
Tacuarembó F.C. players
Uruguayan expatriate sportspeople in Argentina
Uruguayan expatriate sportspeople in Colombia
Uruguayan expatriate sportspeople in Paraguay
Uruguayan expatriate sportspeople in Venezuela
Expatriate footballers in Argentina
Expatriate footballers in Colombia
Expatriate footballers in Paraguay
Expatriate footballers in Venezuela